Linaria chalepensis is a white-flowered plant found in southern Europe, belonging to the family Plantaginaceae (plantain family; unrelated to the fruit).

Sources

References 

chalepensis
Flora of Malta